The 1998–99 season of the Norwegian Premier League, the highest bandy league for men in Norway.

10 games were played, with 2 points given for wins and 1 for draws. Stabæk won the league, whereas Ullevål were relegated following a playoff. The league was expanded with one team ahead of the next season.

League table

References

Seasons in Norwegian bandy
1998 in bandy
1999 in bandy
Band
Band